Fusanishiki Katsuhiko (born Seisho Sakura; January 3, 1936 – July 21, 1993) was a sumo wrestler from Ichikawa, Chiba, Japan. He made his professional debut in January 1952 and reached the top division in May 1957. His highest rank was sekiwake . Upon retirement from active competition, he became an elder in the Japan Sumo Association. He married the daughter of his stable master, ex-maegashira Shachinosato.  He was head coach at Wakamatsu stable from 1979 until 1990, when he left the Sumo Association because of poor health. Former ōzeki Asashio Tarō IV took over as Wakamatsu's head coach in March 1990.

Pre-modern career record
The New year tournament began and the Spring tournament returned to Osaka in 1953.

Modern career record
Since the addition of the Kyushu tournament in 1957 and the Nagoya tournament in 1958, the yearly schedule has remained unchanged.

See also
Glossary of sumo terms
List of past sumo wrestlers
List of sumo tournament second division champions
List of sekiwake

References

1936 births
Japanese sumo wrestlers
Sumo people from Chiba Prefecture
Sekiwake
1993 deaths